Jumping the Broom is a 2011 American romantic comedy-drama film directed by Salim Akil and produced by  Tracey E. Edmonds, Elizabeth Hunter, T.D. Jakes, Glendon Palmer, and Curtis Wallace.

The title of the film is derived from the Black American tradition of bride and groom jumping over a ceremonial broom after being married. As historian Tyler D. Parry notes in Jumping the Broom: The Surprising Multicultural Origins of a Black Wedding Ritual, the film uses the broomstick wedding to explore the intersections of class, race, and culture in the United States, alongside the different conceptions that African Americans hold regarding the custom's relevance for Black matrimony in the 21st century.

The film was shot in Blue Rocks, Nova Scotia, standing in for Martha's Vineyard, the setting for the film. TriStar Pictures distributed the film in the United States on May 6, 2011. The film received mixed reviews with critics positively noting its cultural themes and well-selected cast, but criticized its tone, characterization, predictability, and screenplay.

Plot
Sabrina Watson (Paula Patton) is the only child of the affluent Watson family; her mother Claudine 
(Angela Bassett) and father Greg Watson (Brian Stokes Mitchell) live on Martha's Vineyard. The film starts off with Sabrina with Bobby on the phone with a mistress and he is having an affair. She asks God to help her again get out of this situation and she promises (again) not to have another one-night stand with anyone and only have sex with her future husband. One day, she accidentally hits Jason Taylor (Laz Alonso) when driving and not seeing him. She gets out to offer and overreacts. Jason forgives her and takes up a night of dinner with her. Five months later, after going out, Sabrina tells Jason about her job offer in China and asks him to still be with her in a long-distance relationship but Jason declines. She walks off sad and soon hears a music group singing, and Jason comes back and asks her to marry him, which she accepts.

Sabrina's mother, who is running the wedding, has her doubts but trusts her daughter's judgement. After the couple talk to Reverend James (T.D. Jakes), they decide to stay while a driver picks up Jason's family and friends. Jason's group is his insecure mother Pam (Loretta Devine), his charming uncle Willie Earl (Mike Epps), Pam's best friend Shonda (Tasha Smith) and Jason's cousin Malcolm (DeRay Davis). Also appearing is Sabrina's aunt Geneva (Valarie Pettiford). Their first meeting is awkward as everyone seems to dislike each other and they make small rude remarks. Pam becomes annoyed by Sabrina's acts of kindness and counts three strikes already against her. Sabrina talks to her friends during the cocktail party, one of them being her maid of honor Blythe (Meagan Good). While Blythe goes to get more wine, she meets Chef McKenna (Gary Dourdan), and both instantly feel a connection. Shonda also meets Sabrina's cousin, Sebastian (Romeo Miller), who is instantly drawn to her. Shonda is attracted to him as well but she feels uncomfortable because she thinks he's too young for her. During the dinner at night, Pam gives a rude blessing and has a fight with Claudine but this is stopped by Greg. Claudine also says in French that she thinks Greg is having an affair with his associate Amanda. While outside, Pam listens in on Geneva and Claudine fighting and finds out that Geneva is actually Sabrina's mother and gave Sabrina to Claudine and Greg after she was born.

During the bachelor party, Sabrina and Jason have a fight about his mother wanting them to be jumping the broom. Malcolm talks to Jason and complains and asks why he isn't the best man. Jason tells him that they haven't been best friends in years and Malcolm has only been there to ask for money. When Jason leaves and tries to apologize to Sabrina, Chef McKenna is busy kissing Blythe and not noticing the food which begins to burn which sets off the alarm. Sabrina closes the door on him but they make up through text; however, they have doubts about their wedding.

In the morning, everything begins normally. The boys have a friendly game of football, though Pam tries to tell Jason about Claudine and Geneva's secret. Blythe also talks to McKenna about the relationship. McKenna tells her that he thinks she is beautiful and a relationship is still an option. Greg reveals to Claudine that he is not having an affair, but has made some bad investments and lost most of his money. While Pam is getting fitted in her dress, she tries to confront Sabrina about the secret but is interrupted when Jason gets hurt when pushed by Malcolm. Pam tells Sabrina to ask her parents who are her real parents. Claudine and Geneva tell the truth which hurts Sabrina and causes her to drive off and cancel the wedding. Jason confronts his mother and tells her he is a grown man and to stop treating him like a little boy. Jason tells everyone to look for Sabrina and also punches Malcolm for saying “ Now no one can be the best man now”. Jason prays to God to help him.

Geneva is called by Sabrina who is at the docks in a boat. Geneva gives the story of Sabrina's father. He was a man in Paris whom she loved and planned to travel the world with but she soon found out he had a wife and child and she returned home alone and pregnant. Jason meets back with Sabrina and the two reconcile. Sabrina goes back home to dress. She gets a broom and a note from Pam saying she is returning home and is sorry. She chases down Pam and asks her to stay. They forgive each other and Pam agrees to stay. Jason and Sabrina have the wedding and also jump the broom. After the wedding, Sebastian kisses Shonda, finally winning her affections, and presumably begins a relationship. Greg and Claudine reconcile and she reveals she has secret funds, and that they are still wealthy. Malcolm and Amy (Julie Bowen), the wedding planner, start sharing a moment together in which she asks if he wants to dance with her and he accepts. At the end, the whole family happily does the Cupid Shuffle.

Cast

 Paula Patton as Sabrina Watson
 Laz Alonso as Jason Taylor
 Angela Bassett as Claudine Watson
 Loretta Devine as Pam Taylor
 Valarie Pettiford as Aunt Geneva
 Mike Epps as Willie Earl Taylor
 Brian Stokes Mitchell as Greg Watson
 Meagan Good as Blythe
 Tasha Smith as Shonda Peterkin
 DeRay Davis as Malcolm
 Romeo Miller as Sebastian
 Pooch Hall as Ricky
 Gary Dourdan as Chef McKenna
 Julie Bowen as Amy
 Vera Cudjoe as Mabel
 Tenika Davis as Lauren
 T.D. Jakes as Reverend James
 El DeBarge as Singer
 Laura Kohoot as Amanda

Critical reception
Jumping the Broom received mixed reviews from critics. Review aggregator Rotten Tomatoes gives the film an approval rating of 58%, based on 85 reviews, with an average rating of 6.07/10. The site's critical consensus reads, "Its heart is in the right place – and so is its appealing cast – but Jumping the Broom is ultimately too cliched and thinly written to recommend". On Metacritic the film has a score of 56 out of 100 based on 26 reviews, indicating "mixed or average reviews".

Positive reviews include Kevin Thomas of The Los Angeles Times who said that the film "...is proof that it is still possible for a major studio release to be fun, smart and heart-tugging and devoid of numbskull violence and equally numbing special effects." Roger Ebert of The Chicago Sun-Times said that, "...the cast is large, well chosen and diverting."

Negative reviews include Stephanie Merry of The Washington Post who criticized the characters of the mothers saying, "Any light moments are quickly nullified by the oppressive women vying for the title of world’s meanest mom." John Anderson of Variety also commented on the film's "nasty tone".

Awards and nominations
Black Reel Awards
 Best Picture, nominated
 Best Actor (Laz Alonso), nominated
 Best Supporting Actress (Angela Bassett), nominated
 Best Ensemble, nominated
 Best Director (Salim Akil), nominated
 Best Screenaplay (Elizabeth Hunter & Arlene Gibbs), nominated
NAACP Image Awards
Outstanding Motion Picture, nominated
Outstanding Actor in a Motion Picture (Laz Alonso), Won
Outstanding Actress in a Motion Picture (Paula Patton), nominated
Outstanding Supporting Actor in a Motion Picture (Mike Epps), Won
BET Awards
Best Movie, nominated

Home media
It was released on DVD and Blu-ray on August 9, 2011.

See also
List of black films of the 2010s

References

External links
 
 
 
 
 Jumping the Broom at Metacritic
 

2011 films
2011 directorial debut films
2011 comedy-drama films
2010s English-language films
African-American films
American comedy-drama films
Films about interclass romance
Films about weddings
Films scored by Edward Shearmur
Films set in Martha's Vineyard
Films shot in Nova Scotia
Stage 6 Films films
TriStar Pictures films
2010s American films